Polk Township is one of 12 townships in Huntington County, Indiana, United States. As of the 2020 census, its population was 464.

History
Polk Township was organized in 1846. It was named for President James K. Polk.

Geography

Cities and towns
 Mount Etna (northwest edge)

Unincorporated communities
 Harlansburg

Adjacent townships
 Dallas Township (north)
 Huntington Township (northeast)
 Lancaster Township (east)
 Jefferson Township (southeast)
 Wayne Township (south)
 Liberty Township, Wabash County (southwest)
 Lagro Township, Wabash County (northwest)

Cemeteries
The township contains one cemetery, Monument City Memorial.

Major highways
  Indiana State Road 105
  Indiana State Road 124

Demographics

References
 U.S. Board on Geographic Names (GNIS)
 United States Census Bureau cartographic boundary files

External links
 Indiana Township Association
 United Township Association of Indiana

Townships in Huntington County, Indiana
Townships in Indiana